The Warrington & District Football League was originally formed in 1882 and was reformed in 1919.  It is one of the oldest football leagues in England and in 2013 the league become a F.A. Charter Standard League.
 
Affiliated to the Liverpool County Football Association (L.C.F.A) the Warrington & District League supplies football within a 15-mile radius of Warrington town centre. Split between two English counties of Cheshire and Merseyside, the notable areas in the league are; Warrington, St Helens, Runcorn, Widnes, Knowsley and Newton-le-Willows.
 
Consisting of five divisions, the league has a large structure and over 60 teams participate each season. The divisions are the Premier Division and then Divisions One to Four.

Current Teams 2005-06

Premier Division
Parklands FC 
Avon Athletic
Blackbrook
Burtonwood Albion
Croft
Cromwell
Cronton Villa
Halton Borough
Haydock
Knowsley South
Moorfield
Orford
St. Michaels DH
Vulcan
Windle Labour Club

Division One
Commercial Hotel
Farnworth Griffin
Grange Sports ( northern cup winners 15/16)
Knowsley South Reserves
MG
New Street
Pex Hill
Rainhill Town 'A'
Runcorn Albion
Sankey Vale
Sidac Sports & Social
Sutton Heath

Division Two
Beeches
Carr Mill
Halebank Reserves
Haydock Reserves
Newton-le-Willows
Newton Athletic
Orford Reserves
Railway Rangers
Sidac Social Reserves
Widnes Basils
Winwick
Woolston Rovers

Division Three
Avon Athletic Reserves
Blackbrook Reserves
Cricketers
Earlestown
Halewood Apollo
Halton Borough Reserves
Monks Sports
Parklands
St. Michaels DH Reserves
Hatton Albion
Wellington
Windle Labour Club Reserves
Winwick Athletic
Runcorn Albion Reserves

Division Four
Burtonwood Albion Reserves
Eagle Juniors
Grange Sports Reserves
Halton Borough 'A'
Lomax
Matthiola
Moorfield Reserves
Orford 'A'
Rainhill Town 'B'
The Village Club Culcheth
Vulcan Reserves
West Bank Main Top
Windmill

Division Five
Bruche Athletic
Cronton Villa Reserves
Crosfields
Earlestown Athletic
Liverpool Arms
Newton-le-Willows Reserves
Parklands Reserves
Penketh United
St. Michaels DH 3rd
Sankey Vale Reserves
The Village Reserves
Woolston Rovers Reserves

 
Football leagues in England
Sport in Warrington
Football in Cheshire
1882 establishments in England
Sports leagues established in 1882